Kanite is a Papuan language spoken in Eastern Highlands Province, Papua New Guinea.

References

Further reading
 
 

Kainantu–Goroka languages
Languages of Eastern Highlands Province